The Hino Blue Ribbon (kana:日野・ブルーリボン) is a heavy-duty single-decker bus produced by Hino Motors through the J-Bus joint-venture. The range is primarily available as city bus and tourist coach. It is built by J-Bus as either a complete bus or a bus chassis.

RE/RC (1960-1984) 
RB10-P (1960)
RB10 (1961)
RC10-P (1961)
RC100-P (1962)
RE100 (1967)
RC300/320 (1967)
RE101/121/141/161 (1977)
RC301/321/381 (1977)
RC701P/721P (1979)
K-RE101/121/141/161 (1980)
K-RC301/321/381 (1980)

Blue Ribbon (1982-2000) 
One-step and two-step

The Blue Ribbon was introduced in 1982, The RT/RU22 engine is EM100 6-cylinder, 9.4 litre (225ps) diesel engine. The HT/HU22 engine is ER200 6-cylinder, 11.6 litre (225ps) diesel engine. The HT/HT23, HT/HU2M engine is M10U 6-cylinder, 9.9 litre (230ps) diesel engine.
K-RT/RU22(1982)
P-HT/HU22(1984)
P-HT/HU23(1985)
U-HT/HU2MLAA/MMAA/MPAA(1990)
KC-HT/HU2MLCA/MMCA/MPCA(1995)
Non-step

The Blue Ribbon non-step (low-entry) city bus is introduced in 1997 Tokyo Motor Show. The HU2P engine is P11C 6-cylinder, 10.5 litre (250ps) diesel engine with turbocharger. The HU2P transmission is ZF Ecomat automatic transmission standard.
HU2PM/PP (1997)
KC-HU2PMCE/PPCE (1998)

Blue Ribbon (Tourist coach, 1982-1990) 
K-RU60/63(1982)
P-RU60/63(1985)

Blue Ribbon HIMR (1991-2001) 
HIMR is hybrid vehicle. Induction motor and batteries equipped in car. When vehicle start, motor assist engine, and braking, motor operating as electric retarder, and accumulate energy to battery.    
U-HU2MLAkai(1991)
U-HU2MLAH(1994)
KC-RU1JLCH(1995)

Blue Ribbon City (2000-2005) 
KL-HT/HU2PMEE/PEE/LEA/MEA/REA(2000)
Engine: P11C (turbocharged: 250PS or 300PS)
Transmission: 5-speed manual or ZF Ecomat (non-step: standard)

Blue Ribbon City HIMR (2001-2005) 
HU1J is one-step model, battery changed to Ni-MH.
HM-HU1JLEP/MEP(2001)
Engine: J08C (turbocharged: 177 kW/240PS) with motor-assisted

Blue Ribbon City Hybrid (2005-2015) 
The Blue Ribbon City Hybrid is the only hybrid electric city bus in production with Hino Motors. Most of them are primarily made in full length chassis whereas some of them are made in medium-length chassis. HU8J is non-step model, equipped 4 Ni-MH batteries from Toyota Prius on the roof.
ACG-HU8JLFP/MFP(2005)
BJG-HU8JLFP/MFP(2007)
Engine: J08E-1M (turbocharged: 177 kW/240PS) with motor-assisted
LJG-HU8JLGP/MGP(2010)
LNG-HU8JLGP/MGP(2012)
Engine: J08E-1M (turbocharged: 206 kW/280PS) with motor-assisted

FCHV-BUS (2002-2005) 
The Toyota FCHV-BUS is the 1st of fuel cell bus in Japan, based Hino KL-HU2PMEE.

Blue Ribbon II (2004-2015) 
The Hino Blue Ribbon II is a rebadged Isuzu Erga. It has a rounded roof dome similar to the Rainbow II with a double-curvature windscreen and a separately mounted destination blind.
 KL-KV280L1/N1 (2004)
 PJ-KV234L1/N1/Q1 (2004)
 PDG/PKG-KV234L2/N2/Q2 (2007)
 LKG/LDG-KV234L3/N3/Q3 (2010)
 QPG/QKG/QDG-KV234L3/N3/Q3 (2012)

Blue Ribbon (2015-present) 
Hino named the original name.
QRG/QPG/QKG/QDG-KV290N1/Q1 (2015)
Engine: 4HK1 (turbocharged: 184 kW/250PS)
2TG/2PG/2 kg/2DG-KV290N2/Q2 (2017)
Engine: 4HK1 (turbocharged: 177 kW/240PS)

Blue Ribbon Hybrid (2015-present) 
The Blue Ribbon Hybrid is made at Utsunomiya Works.
QSG-HL2ANAP/ASAP (2015)
Engine: A05C (turbocharged: 184 kW/250PS) with motor-assisted
2SG-HL2ANBP/ASBP (2017)
Engine: A05C (turbocharged: 191 kW/260PS) with motor-assisted

Shinjin RC420TP 

Shinjin RC420TP is a rear engine high speed bus licence build from Hino Blue Ribbon RC Series bus.

Shinjin RC420TP, the express bus class was introduced in February 1971.  The body was used from Hino RC300P series, but used the longer Hino RC320P chassis.  This series were equip with the Hino's DK20-T turbo-diesel engine.  The last one was produced in June 1972.  Only 67 units were made before GM Korea took over.  Other version, the RC420 sub series were also made with leaf spring suspension system.

See also 

 Shinjin Motor (1955~1971) section at Daewoo Bus
 Buses section at Shinjin Motors
 List of buses

References

External links 

 Hino Blue Ribbon and Rainbow Homepage
 Zyle Daewoo Bus Company: History Before 1970S (Shinjin RC420TP picture marquee)
 기업연혁: 신진자동차 (Production information)
 기업연혁: G.M코리아 (End date reason)
 버스와 트럭의 운전게임 마 이 티 M.I.G.H.T.Y 
 신진 RC420 이 있었다?  (Discussion on Shinjin RC420 bus)
 대우 자동차, 이름, 뜻,종류 (Successor of High Speed Bus Class)
 若松様から頂いた写真のうち、1986年に撮影したものです。  (1971 Hino RC300P)
 RC420TP 고속버스 (Pictures of Shinjin RC420TP High Speed Bus)
 1971~72년에 생산된 신진히노 RC420TP의 원형을 찾아봤습니다 (Body/Chassis differences)

Blueribbon
Bus chassis
Midibuses
Low-entry buses
Low-floor buses
Step-entrance buses
Fuel cell vehicles
Hybrid electric buses
Buses of Japan
Full-size buses
Vehicles introduced in 1982